William Harvey  (1754–1779) was a British politician who sat in the House of Commons from 1775 to 1779.
 
Harvey was the eldest son of  William Harvey of Rolls Park, Essex, and his wife  Emma Skynner, daughter of Stephen Skynner of Walthamstow, Essex, and was born on 10 September 1754. He was admitted at Trinity College, Cambridge on 3 November 1771.
 
Harvey was abroad when he was approved unanimously at a county meeting and was then returned unopposed as Member of Parliament for Essex at a by-election on 28 November 1775. In Parliament, he only voted once and is not known to have spoken.

Harvey died unmarried on 24 April 1779 and was buried at Hempstead, Essex. His estates passed to his brother Eliab Harvey.

External links
Artnet Portrait of William Harvey

References

1754 births
1779 deaths
Alumni of Trinity College, Cambridge
British MPs 1774–1780
Members of the Parliament of Great Britain for English constituencies